Tao Yuanming (365–427), also known as Tao Qian (also T'ao Ch'ien in Wade–Giles), was a Chinese poet and politician who was one of the best-known poets during the Six Dynasties period. He was born during the Eastern Jin dynasty (317–420) and died during the Liu Song (420–479) dynasty (Jin-Song transition). Tao Yuanming spent much of his life in reclusion, living in the countryside, farming, reading, drinking wine, receiving the occasional guest, and writing poems in which he often reflected on the pleasures and difficulties of life, as well as his decision to withdraw from civil service. Tao's simple and direct style was somewhat at odds with the norms for literary writing in his time. Relatively well known as a recluse poet in the Tang dynasty (618–907), during the Northern Song dynasty (960–1127), influential literati figures such as Su Shi (1037–1101) declared him a paragon of authenticity and spontaneity in poetry, that Tao Yuanming would achieve lasting literary fame. However, Tao Yuanming's inclusion in the 6th century literary anthology Wen Xuan argues for at least a beginning of fame in his own era, at least in his own birth area. Tao Yuanming would later be regarded as the foremost representative of what we now know as Fields and Gardens poetry. Tao Yuanming found inspiration in the beauty and serenity of the natural world close at hand. Tao Yuanming is depicted in the Wu Shuang Pu (Table of Peerless Heroes) by Jin Guliang.

Names
In the middle of his life, Tao changed his name (keeping his family name) from Tao Yuanming to Tao Qian. "Master of the Five Willows", another name which he used when quite young, seems to be a sobriquet of his own invention. There is a surviving autobiographical essay from his youth in which Tao Yuanming uses "Five Willows" to allude to himself. After this, Tao refers to himself in his earlier writings as "Yuanming"; however; it is thought that with the demise of the Eastern Jin dynasty in 420, that he began to refer to himself as "Qian", meaning "hiding", as a signification of his final withdrawal into the quiet life in the country and his decision to avoid any further participation in the political scene. Tao Qian could also be translated "Recluse Tao". However, this in no way implies an eremitic lifestyle or extreme asceticism; rather a comfortable dwelling, with family, friends, neighbors, musical instruments, wine, a nice library, and the beautiful scenery of a mountain farm were Tao Qian's compensation for giving up on the lifestyle of Tao Yuanming, government servant.

The names Yuanliang, Shenming, and Quanming are all associated with Tao Yuanming. Some of this confusion results from a naming taboo during the Tang dynasty, specifically that the characters for an emperor's name were impermissible to use either to write or even to casually pronounce. This taboo required the substitution of similar characters or words in order to avoid this prohibition. As the "High Founder" of the Tang dynasty (posthumously titled Emperor Gaozu of Tang) had the personal name Li Yuan, the yuan character became taboo. So, since this was the same as the yuan in Yuanming, various authors substituted the synonymous shen for yuan—both referring to "depths".

Life

Ancestry
Tao Yuanming's great-grandfather was the eminent Jin dynasty general and governor, Tao Kan (259–334). His grandfather and father also both served as government officials, rising to the level of county governor. However, the family circumstances into which Tao Yuanming was born were only those of moderate poverty and lack of much political influence. Family circumstances included the death of his father when he was eight years old.

Personal background

Tao Yuanming is considered to be a person of the Eastern Jin dynasty (316/317 – 419/420 CE), although living beyond the demise of that dynasty. The last stable period in Chinese history had been during the Han dynasty (206 BCE – 220 CE), which was followed by the various political permutations known as the Three Kingdoms, one of these successor states being Cao Wei, founded and ruled by the Cao clan, and basically briefly reunifying China. The Jin dynasty was founded and controlled by the Sima clan, the leading members of which were known for gaining and retaining power through corruption. This began before the birth of Tao Yuanming, when Sima Yan usurped the throne of the monarchal ruler of Cao Wei dynasty, establishing its headquarters at the western capital of Chang'an, and renaming the kingdom Jin. Subsequently, the history of the dynasty was characterized by nepotism, corrupt politics, civil disorder, and violence. Various other clans also vied for power. The Sima fought against these as well as each other. The weaknesses inherent in the system culminated in the War of the Eight Princes (291 to 306), all eight princes being Simas. Immediate subsequent events resulted in certain bandits or revolutionaries and various neighboring powers overrunning the country. These neighboring powers to the north and west were not ethnic Han Chinese, and for these reasons were referred to as were referred to as the Five Hu, or Wu Hu, one of which was a Xiongnu empire—this event is thus known as the Uprising of the Five Hu. The Xiongnu overthrew remnants of the Sima princes and the bandit leaders north of the Yangzi river, eventually capturing, and killing the two last Sima rulers of Western Jin, and in the process capturing the capital Chang'an. Upon the territory north of the Yangzi being captured, a southerner named Sima Rui set up a new Jin dynasty state with a capital at Jiankang. This new Jin empire continued the traditions of violence and corruption of their predecessor; and, it was this manifestation of Jin, known as Eastern Jin, was the one in which Tao Yuanming was born and lived most of his life. Control of Eastern Jin was usurped by a series of successors of various clans, and also subject to less-successful rebellions by various warlords, and also facing external threats from other states such as Northern Wei, whose dynastic rulers were of the Tuoba (Tabgach) clan of the Xianbei. Eventually the whole Jin state was replaced by Liu Song, in 419/420. This new dynasty was named Song (like the much later, larger dynasty) and was ruled by the Liu family, and was also corrupt and short-lived. Versions of Tao Yuanming's biography in the Chinese source material vary as to his name and age during the various historical events of Eastern Jin and Liu Song known from other sources.

Birth

Tao Yuanming was born during the Eastern Jin dynasty (317–420), in Chaisang, a place which is now a district of the city of Jiujiang in Jiangxi Province, China.

Year of birth controversy
Tao Yuanming is generally believed to have been born in the year 365 CE in Chaisang (modern Jiujiang), an area of great natural beauty. At the time Jiujiang was named Jiangzhou, and had an actively Buddhist governor. This birth date is confirmed in Tao's biography in the Book of Jin, which state that he was born "in the third year of the Xingning Reign Period of Emperor Ai", or Common Era year 365. However, there is some uncertainty regarding this date, and the Chinese scholar Yuan Xingpei has argued that Tao was actually born in 352.

Place of birth
The name of Tao Yuanming's ancestral village, Chaisang, literally means "Mulberry-Bramble". Nearby sights have included Mountain Lu, Poyang Lake (then known as P'eng-li), as well as a good selection of nature's features located in the immediate vicinity of Chaisang.

Younger years
Detailed information on Tao Yuanming's younger years are not known, although it is safe to say that they were lived in a difficult environment. When he would have been eighteen or nineteen, both the invasion by the state of Former Qin (ruled by an ethnically Hu dynasty) and the events culminating in the Battle of Fei River (383) occurred; after great risk to the existence of Eastern Jin this, against the odds, resulted in gains of territory north of Yangzi river, while also whetting Eastern Jin appetites for reconquering the former northern territories. Many events would occur during Tao Yuanming's lifetime, including two revolts leading to the usurpation of the throne, and eventually, in his old age, the overthrow of Eastern Jin.

Incident at Tiger Creek Bridge

Tao Yuanming's birthplace was very near Mountain Lu, which became a center of Buddhism, and eventually a source of origin for Pure Land Buddhism. According to historical accounts, in the eleventh year of emperor Xiaowu's Taiyuan reign period (386), when Tao Yuanming would have been 21 years old, Buddhist priest Huiyuan (later considered the First Ancestor of Pure Land Buddhism) came to build the Donglin Monastery and organized the White Lotus Society, or a branch thereof. Many scholars and poets participated in the Huiyuan's social circle, centered at the mountain monastery. According to the book Stories of Worthy Personages in the Lotus Society, Master Huiyuan was supposed to never leave the monastery, except for one time. The official border of the monastery was known as Tiger Creek (also known as Tiger Gorge), named for the tigers then inhabiting the neighboring hills and over which spanned a bridge. However, once, following a visit by Tao Yuanming and another scholar, Master Huiyuan, on accompanying his guests out, became so wrapped up in their conversation, that he did not notice that he was leaving the monastery grounds. Upon crossing the Tiger Creek Bridge, the local tigers were so astonished at this departure from the Master's practice of never leaving the monastery grounds that they began roaring and howling. The story goes on to say that once Huiyuan realized he had breached his practice, the three all burst out laughing. This incident later became the subject of the famous paintings of "Three Laughing Men at Tiger Creek" (Pinyin: hǔ xī sān xiào).

Government service
Tao Yuanming ended up serving more than ten years in government service, personally involved with the sordid political scene of the times, which he did in five stints. Tao served in both civil and military capacities, which included making several trips down the Yangzi to the capital Jiankang, then a thriving metropolis, and the center of power during the Six Dynasties. The ruins of the old Jiankang walls can still be found in the modern municipality of Nanjing. During this period, Tao Yuanming's poems begin to indicate that he was becoming torn between ambition and a desire to retreat into solitude.

Political background

Through the history of the times, enough is known of the general state of affairs during Tao's governmental career to indicate why such service during that sorry state of political affairs was so miserable for him: Tao Yuanming served under the two usurpers Huan Xuan and Liu Yu, not to mention the weak and pitiful emperor An.

The future emperor An of Eastern Jin (born 382 and personally named Sima Dezong) was a scion of the dynastic ruling family of the Jin empire, the Sima. His father was emperor Xiaowu, who named him crown prince in 387, despite his extreme developmental disabilities (being unable to dress himself, speak, or generally communicate). When Xiaowu was murdered in bed by his secondary wife, the Lady Zhang, An was crowned emperor in 397. Acting as regent, actual control of the empire was in the hands of emperor An's father's younger brother Sima Daozi. The regent, Sima Daozi, could dress himself and communicate verbally, but nevertheless was not that capable of a ruler, with a reputation for feasting and drinking rather than attending to affairs of state, and surrounding himself with flatterers. Various insurrections developed during the span of this corrupt and incompetent government, mostly unsuccessful, a state of affairs which did not change much when Sima Daozi's son Sima Yuanxian succeeded as regent (an event reported to happening during a bout of drunkenness on the part of Sima Daozi). Eventually, the warlord Huan Xuan was able to consolidate enough power to seize the regency for himself. Huan Xuan was a kleptocrat, who found some way to seize whatever valuable objects or properties that he envied. Besides that, Huan had a habit of tyrannically punishing any official who made the slightest mistake or whom he was suspicious of. In 403, Huan had emperor An abdicate, so that he himself could be ruler both in fact and in name, and renamed his empire as the Chu dynasty. Shortly thereafter Huan Xuan was killed during the course of an uprising, in 404/405. The rebels then restored emperor An to his nominal position, and the empire's name to Jin. The leader of the rebels was Huan Xuan's general Liu Yu, who proceeded to rule as regent for emperor An. A typical pattern of external warfare and rebellions from within followed. In 418/419 Liu Yu had an assassin kill emperor An. Liu Yu installed An's younger brother (Sima Dewen) as emperor Gong, with Liu Yu retaining the real power. Liu Yu then forced Gong to abdicate, and not long after had him assassinated. Upon Gong's abdication, Liu Yu had himself named as Emperor Wu of Song, thus officially ending the Jin dynasty. This is the government in which Tao Yuanming served, and his poems portray his increasing discontent with doing so, whether or not he was really inclined to do so anyway is less clear (and he seems to have other personal, family reasons for his decision to resign). Nevertheless, after around a decade of service, Tao decided to leave the government and go back to his home region.

Five stints as a government official

Tao Yuanming's first stint in government was as State Officer of Rites, when he was about twenty-nine. He did this in part due to family poverty, and to support his aged parents. However, he had a difficult time of it and returned home. Accounts of Tao's second and third government service stints vary somewhat. One source of information is A Year-by-Year Biography of Tao Yuanming by Lu Qingli. Tao's second stint in government seems to have been working for Huan Xuan. According to Lu, Tao served in the government during the Long'an years of emperor An, during the time of the Sun En revolt. (Sun En seems to have been a populist magician associated with the Way of the Five Pecks of Rice movement.) Tao would have been about thirty-five years old, and the warlord Huan Xuan had become governor of Tao's home province, Jiangzhou. Huan had a plan to coordinate with other warlords (including Liu Yu) to eradicate Sun En. Again according to Lu, Tao Yuanming was the official to go to the imperial capital, Jiankang, and officially submit this proposal to the imperial government. After receiving approval, Huan and associates successfully subdued the rebellion. Then, about three tears later, Huan Xuan and other warlords rebelled, and captured both the capital city and the emperor, An, and thus the imperial power. But by this time Tao Yuanming was working not for Huan but as Defense Strategist (apparently his third stint as a government official), handling paperwork for Liu Yu, the general in charge of defending the Sima-lead imperial government. There was also a fourth stint. When he was about forty, Tao worked for general Liu Jingxuan, who resigned about a year later, and Tao along with him. Tao Yuanming's fifth and final stint, as Penze county magistrate (beginning March of the first year of the Yixing regnal year), only lasted about eighty days, as he resigned in August the same year. This was the time period when he wrote his essay "To Return", in his preface to which he mentions taking the job because having "a house full of little kids", and goes on to explain why he wants to give up government work and return home. Each stint seems to have lasted no more than a few years, and each time Tao Yuanming seems to have resigned and returned home. Officially, his retirement was due to the sudden death of his younger sister and his need to attend to the funeral rites. Another reason, given by his biographer Xiao Tong, was that Tao was faced with the imminent imposition of an onerous supervisor, whom he was told he "had to treat right", and which was the occasion of him saying, "I won't bow to a bucolic boy for the sake of five pecks of rice." Subsequently, despite various offers by Liu Yu, after he became emperor, Tao Yuanming refused to return to government service. Of Tao Yuanming's career Su Shi describe him as "working for the government when he desired to, without feeling shame in his requests; retiring when he desired to, without thinking himself lofty."

Return to the fields

In the Spring of 405, Tao Yuanming was serving in the army, as aide-de-camp to the local commanding officer. The death of his sister together with his disgust at the corruption and infighting of the Jin Court prompted him to resign. As Tao himself put it, he would not "bow like a servant in return for five pecks of grain", a saying which has entered common usage meaning "swallowing one's pride in exchange for a meager existence". "Five pecks of grain" was among other things the specified salary of certain low-rank officials. Certainly Tao Yuanming's salary as Penze County Magistrate was far higher than five pecks, so this was a symbolic expression. For the last 22 years of his life, he lived in retirement on his small farmstead.

Children and family

Tao Yuanming married two times. His first wife died when he was in his thirties.

Tao Yuanming had five sons. The oldest son was Tao Yan, as mentioned in his letter "A Letter to My Sons Yan, Etc.", a sort of apology for any hunger or cold which they suffered as a result of following his ideal and conscience and not working for the government anymore. The daughters, if any, were unrecorded (as customary). However, just how this occurred within the chronology of his life is unknown.

Religious and philosophical influences
Tao Yuanming's works show a certain spiritual side to them. The three main sources of religious/philosophical influence on Tao Yuanming were Confucian, Buddhist, and Taoist.

In his youth, Tao says, "I enjoyed studying the Six Classics." He mentions this in Title 16 of his Drinking Poems series. The Six Classics refers to the Six Confucian Classics (now the Five Classics, due to the loss of the Book of Music), fundamental Confucian texts. Tao shows his Taoist influence in various works, for example, through such lines as "I long to return to Nature" from his poem "Returning to Country and Farming", or his sentiments in his essay "Return". In these texts, Tao deprecates artificial limits or restrictions in interpersonal relationships, instead expressing the desire for a simple life, with nature taking its course. Also in "Returning to Country and Farming", Tao Yuanming shows a Buddhist side (although he never formally became a Buddhist): "Life is like an illusion; everything returns to emptiness," he says, echoing the Buddhist sutras. His ability to absorb and creatively employ the three diverse religions/philosophies leads Florence Chia-ying Yeh to say: "Among the Chinese poets, Tao Yuanming had the greatest perseverance and integrity. His power to persevere was based upon his acceptance and absorption of the essentials of various philosophies, such as Confucianism, Taoism, and Buddhism. He mastered not only the external words, doctrines, and rituals, but also had a thorough internal understanding and acceptance of the best and most valuable parts of those schools of thought."

Death
His main biographies give Tao Yuanming's death as "in the fourth year of the Yuanjia reign period of Emperor Wen". Thus, Tao Qian is generally but not universally held to have died in 427, which mathematically works out to the age of 63. If, however, he was in fact born in 352, he would instead have been 76 years old when he died.

Sources
There are various sources with information about Tao Yuanming. As he lived in the Jin dynasty, he is chronicled in the Book of Jin. Since he lived into Liu Song times, he is also chronicled in the Book of Song. Tao Yuanming has another biography in the History of the South. There is also some information to be found in his preserved works, which were first systematically collected by Xiao Tong, a Liang dynasty prince (princely title Zhaoming), who also included a biography in his book Wen Xuan.

Works and legacy
Approximately 130 of his works survive, consisting mostly of poems or essays which depict an idyllic pastoral life of farming and drinking.

Poetry

Because his poems depict a life of farming and of drinking his homemade wine, he would later be termed "Poet of the Fields". In Tao Yuanming's poems can be found superlative examples of the theme which urges its audience to drop out of official life, move to the country, and take up a cultivated life of wine, poetry, and avoiding people with whom friendship would be unsuitable, but in Tao's case this went along with actually engaging in farming. Tao's poetry also shows an inclination to fulfillment of duty, such as feeding his family. Tao's simple and plain style of expression, reflecting his back-to-basics lifestyle, first became better known as he achieved local fame as a hermit. This was followed gradually by recognition in major anthologies. By the Tang dynasty, Tao was elevated to greatness as a poet's poet, revered by Li Bai and Du Fu.

Han poetry, Jian'an poetry, the Seven Sages of the Bamboo Grove, and the other earlier Six dynasties poetry foreshadowed some of Tao's particular symbolism and the general "returning home to the country" theme, and also somewhat separately show precursory in evolving of poetic form, based on the yuefu style which traces its origin to the Han dynasty Music Bureau. An example given of the thematic evolution of one of Tao's poetic themes is Zhang Heng's Return to the Field, written in the Classical Chinese poetry form known as the fu, or "rhapsody" style, but Tao's own poetry (including his own "Return to the Field" poem) tends to be known for its use of the more purely poetic shi which developed as a regular line length form from the literary yuefu of the Jian'an and foreshadows the verse forms favored in Tang poetry, such as gushi, or "old-style verse". Tao's poems, prose and their combination of form and theme into his own style broke new ground and became a fondly relied upon historical landmark. Much subsequent Chinese painting and literature would require no more than the mention or image of chrysanthemums by the eastern fence to call to mind Tao Yuanming's life and poetry. Later, his poetry and the particular motifs which Tao Yuanming exemplified would prove to importantly influence the innovations of Beat poetry and the 1960s poetry of the United States and Europe. Both in the 20th century and subsequently, Tao Yuanming has come to occupy a position as one of the select group of great world poets.

Poems
The following is an extract from a poem Tao wrote, in the year 409, in regard to a traditional Chinese holiday:

Written on the Ninth Day of the Ninth Month of the Year yi-yu

The myriad transformations
 unravel one another
And human life
 how should it not be hard?
From ancient times
 there was none but had to die,
 Remembering this
scorches my very heart.
 What is there I can do
 to assuage this mood?
 Only enjoy myself
 drinking my unstrained wine.
 I do not know
 about a thousand years,
 Rather let me make
 this morning last forever.

Poem number five of Tao's "Drinking Wine" series is translated by Arthur Waley:

I built my hut in a zone of human habitation

 my hut in a zone of human habitation,
Yet near me there sounds no noise of horse or coach.
Would you know how that is possible?
A heart that is distant creates a wilderness round it.
I pluck chrysanthemums under the eastern hedge,
Then gaze long at the distant summer hills.
The mountain air is fresh at the dusk of day:
The flying birds two by two return.
In these things there lies a deep meaning;
Yet when we would express it, words suddenly fail us.

Another, from the same source is "Returning to the Fields" (alternatively translated by others as "Return to the Field"):

 I was young, I was out of tune with the herd:
My only love was for the hills and mountains.
Unwitting I fell into the Web of the World's dust
And was not free until my thirtieth year.
The migrant bird longs for the old wood:
The fish in the tank thinks of its native pool.
I had rescued from wildness a patch of the Southern Moor
And, still rustic, I returned to field and garden.
My ground covers no more than ten acres:
My thatched cottage has eight or nine rooms.
Elms and willows cluster by the eaves:
Peach trees and plum trees grow before the hall.
Hazy, hazy the distant hamlets of men.
Steady the smoke of the half-deserted village,
A dog barks somewhere in the deep lanes,
A cock crows at the top of the mulberry tree.
At gate and courtyard—no murmur of the World's dust:
In the empty rooms—leisure and deep stillness.
Long I lived checked by the bars of a cage:
Now I have turned again to Nature and Freedom.

Tao's poems greatly influenced the ensuing poetry of the Tang and Song Dynasties. A great admirer of Tao, Du Fu wrote a poem Oh, Such a Shame of life in the countryside:

Only by wine one's heart is lit,
only a poem calms a soul that's torn.
You'd understand me, Tao Qian.
I wish a little sooner I was born!

Peach Blossom Spring

Aside from his poems, Tao is also known for his short, influential, and intriguing prose depiction of a land hidden from the outside world called "Peach Blossom Spring". The name Peach Blossom Spring (Tao Hua Yuan) is now a well known, standard Chinese term for a utopia. This fable recounted by Tao Yuanming begins with a claim that it occurred in the Taiyuan era of the Jin dynasty (376–396). According to the story, a fisher gets lost and discovers a place out of time, but cannot find it again after he leaves and tells of its existence. It is a very influential story.

Legacy
Tao Yuanming's literary legacy also includes his influence on later poets and authors. One example is Song dynasty poet Xin Qiji. Another example is Su Shi's composition "Matching Tao's Poems", in which the Song dynasty poet wrote a new poem in response to Tao's poems, but used the same rhymes for his lines. Another poet inspired in part by Tao Yuanming was the 16th century Korean poet Yi Hwang.

Critical appraisal
Zhong Rong (468–518) described Yuanming's literary style as "spare and limpid, with scarcely a surplus word." In Poetry Gradings Zhong Rong wrote:
[Yuanming's] sincerity is true and traditional, his verbalized inspirations supple and relaxed. When one reads his works, the fine character of the poet himself comes to mind. Ordinary men admire his unadorned directness. But such lines of his as "With happy face I pour the spring-brewed wine," and "The sun sets, no clouds are in the sky," are pure and refined in the beauty of their air. These are far from being merely the words of a farmer. He is the father of recluse poetry past and present.

Su Shi (1037–1101), one of the major poets of the Song era, said that the only poet he was particularly fond of was Yuanming, who "deeply impressed [him] by what he was as a man." Su Shi exalted Yuanming's "unadorned and yet beautiful, spare and yet ample" poems, and even asserted that "neither Cao Zhi, Liu Zhen, Bao Zhao, Xie Lingyun, Li Bai, nor Du Fu achieves his stature".

Huang Tingjian (1045–1105), one of the Four Masters of the Song dynasty and a younger friend of Su Shi, said, "“When you’ve just come of age, reading these poems seems like gnawing on withered wood. But reading them after long experience in the world, it seems the decisions of your life were all made in ignorance.”

Lin Yutang (1895–1976) considered Yuanming the perfect example of "the true lover of life". He praised the harmony and simplicity in Yuanming's life as well as in his style, and claimed that he "represents the most perfectly harmonious and well-rounded character in the entire Chinese literary tradition."

In Great lives from history (1988), Frank Northen Magill highlights the "candid beauty" of Yuanming's poetry, stating that the "freshness of his images, his homespun but Heaven-aspiring morality, and his steadfast love of rural life shine through the deceptively humble words in which they are expressed, and as a consequence he has long been regarded one of China's most accomplished and accessible poets." He also discusses what makes Yuanming unique as a poet, and why his works were perhaps overlooked by his contemporaries:
It is this fundamental love of simplicity that distinguishes T'ao Ch'ien's verses from the works of court poets of his time, who utilized obscure allusions and complicated stylistic devices to fashion verses that appealed only to the highly educated. T'ao Ch'ien, by way of contrast, seldom made any literary allusions whatsoever, and he wrote for the widest possible audience. As a consequence, he was slighted by his era's critics and only fully appreciated by later generations of readers.

Gallery
Tao Yuanming has inspired not only generations of poets, but also painters and other artists.

Translation

Editions
 Meng Erdong ed. Tao Yuanming Ji Yi Zhu .
 Wu Zheshun ed. Tao Yuanming Ji   
 David Hinton (translator). The Selected Poems of T'ao Ch'ien (Copper Canyon Press, 1993) .
 Karl-Heinz Pohl (translator). Der Pfirsichbluetenquell (Bochum University Press, 2002)
 Davis, A.R. T'ao Yuan-ming (Hong Kong, 1983) 2 vols.
 William Acker (translator). T'ao the Hermit: Sixty Poems by T'ao Ch'ien, 365–427 (London & New York: Thames and Hudson, 1952)
 Philippe Uguen-Lyon (translator), Tao Yuanming : Œuvres complètes , Paris, Les Belles Lettres, 2022 .

Commentary
 Ashmore, Robert. The Transport of Reading: Text and Understanding in the World of Tao Qian (365–427) (Cambridge: Harvard University Asia Center, 2010) 
 Hightower, James R. Poetry of T'ao Ch'ien .
 Xiaofei Tian. Tao Yuanming and Manuscript Culture: The Record of a Dusty Table .

See also

Boyi and Shuqi
Chinese garden
Classical Chinese poetry
Fields and Gardens poetry
History of Jiangxi
Humble Administrator's Garden
I. M. Pei
Six Dynasties poetry
Three laughs at Tiger Brook
Utopia
Xin Qiji
Zhang Heng

References

Citations

Sources 

 Cai, Zong-qi, ed. (2008). How to Read Chinese Poetry: A Guided Anthology. New York: Columbia University Press. .
 Chang, H. C. (1977). Chinese Literature 2: Nature Poetry. (New York, NY: Columbia University Press). .
 Cui, Jie and Zong-qi Cai (2012). How to Read Chinese Poetry Workbook. New York: Columbia University Press. .
 Davis, A. R. (Albert Richard), Editor and Introduction (1970), The Penguin Book of Chinese Verse. (Baltimore: Penguin Books).
 Hinton, David (2008). Classical Chinese Poetry: An Anthology. New York: Farrar, Straus, and Giroux.  / .
 Holzman, Donald. "A Dialogue with the Ancients: Tao Qian's Interrogation of Confucius" in Scott Pearce, Audrey Spiro, Patricia Ebrey (eds.), Culture and Power in the Reconstitution of the Chinese Realm, 200–600. Harward, 2001:75–98.
 Liao, Zhongan, "Tao Yuanming". Encyclopedia of China (Chinese Literature Edition), 1st ed.
 
Watson, Burton (1971). CHINESE LYRICISM: Shih Poetry from the Second to the Twelfth Century. (New York: Columbia University Press). 
Yip, Wai-lim (1997). Chinese Poetry: An Anthology of Major Modes and Genres. (Durham and London: Duke University Press). 
Yeh Chia-ying, translation Josey Shun and Bhikshuni Heng Yin, "Vajra Bhodi Sea" No.343, December, 1998, and subsequent similar IP addresses. 《陶淵明詩講錄》 ("Lectures on Tao Yuan-ming's Poems"), a series of lectures on the poetry of Tao Yuanming at Gold Buddha Monastery, Canada (lecture tapes were transcribed by Tu Xiaoli, An Yi, and Yang Aidi)

External links 

 
 
 
Collected Works of Tao Yuanming at World Digital Library
 The Columbia University Press web page accompanying Cai 2008 has PDF and MP3 files for four of Tao's poems (6.1–4) and CUP's web page accompanying Cui 2012 includes MP3 files of modern Chinese translations for two of these (P10-11)
 Tao Yuanming Poems in English
 A translation of the poem ‘Going Back Home’ by Táo Yuānmíng from 'The Land of Pure Bliss" by Peter Lunde Johnson 

365 births
427 deaths
4th-century Chinese poets
5th-century Chinese poets
Jin dynasty (266–420) politicians
Jin dynasty (266–420) poets
Liu Song poets
Poets from Jiangxi
Politicians from Jiujiang
Legendary Chinese people